Every Polish citizen 18 years of age or older residing permanently in Poland is required to have an identity card (Dowód osobisty) issued by the local office of civic affairs. Children as well as Polish citizens living permanently abroad are entitled, but not required, to have one. Identity cards are valid for a period of 10 years (5 years for children under the age of 5 on the date of issue).

The front bears a photo of the holder, surname, forenames, date of birth, nationality, card number, gender and expiry date. It also contains the coat of arms of Poland and a security hologram partially covering the photo (which makes forgery harder). In the bottom right corner a special security element can be found – the photo of the person and the year of expiration, but only one of them can be seen at a time, depending on the angle of view. Below that, the card access number can be found. That number is necessary to connect with an embedded microchip (when using e-signature for instance).

On the back can be found the holder's place of birth (city in Poland or foreign country's name), date of issue, repeated card number, issuing authority, legal ascendant(s) name(s) and personal number (PESEL – Powszechny Elektroniczny System Ewidencji Ludności – universal electronic population database). Below the card number the bearer's photo is repeated and some of the personal data in machine-readable form. On the top of the back side the card access number is represented in a bar code.

The Polish identity card also functions as a travel document in certain countries.

History
From 1919 until 1928, the term "Polish identity card" was used to describe the document necessary for foreign travel. This effectively served as a de facto passport for international travel (despite the name "personal ID card" on the cover in the interior was already called a passport). The fee for its release was high: in June 1923 it was 90,000 Polish marks, and in 1930 101 Polish złotys. In this form, the "Polish identity card" also served as a form of resident registration in which temporary stays in the country were also entered (outside the place of permanent check-in). The pre-1928 "Polish identity card" took the form of a cardboard sheet folded in half and contained personal data, photography, occupation, religion, literacy information and description. Over time, evidence grew into a 16-page booklet in a cardboard cover, of which 11 pages were intended for credentials of reports.

The first true Polish identity card was introduced by presidential decree during the Second Polish Republic era in 1928. It was issued by commune offices at the request of interested persons for a fee of 60 groszy and was not mandatory (art. 18). This took the form of a card made of grey-blue, rigid paper folded in half.

During World War II, in areas of Poland occupied by Germany (General Government), Kennkarten were issued to Polish residents living in said areas.

In 1951–1953, during the Polish People's Republic era, new internal passport booklets were introduced in which every Polish citizen had to be in possession of.

After the fall of communism in Poland, internal passport booklets continued to be issued until 2001, when a plastic card design was introduced.

The 2015 issue
Since 2015, ID cards no longer contain the holder's registered residential address.

The security features include a small map of Poland at the top centre which changes colour between green and violet depending on the viewing angle. There is also a micro-printing in the card's background which reveals "RZECZPOSPOLITAPOLSKA" when magnified. Both the family name and date of birth have a special raised feel.

The 2019 issue 
Since March 2019, ID cards contain a RFID chip that stores personal data as well as a number of digital certificates that allow authentication of the holder or verify their identity in public or private digital systems.

To connect with a chip, a card access number and a personal identification number must be provided. The basic e-signature (recognised the same as handwritten signature by all public facilities, like municipal offices, central administration, courts etc.) functionality is provided free-of-charge for all citizens age 18 or older.

New e-IDs can also be used in automatic border gates at some Polish airports (namely Warsaw Chopin Airport, Modlin Airport and Poznań–Ławica Airport). Gates can also be used by all EU/EEA/CH e-passport holders, but only Polish citizens can use their e-IDs; other EU electronic identity cards are not accepted (but are fully accepted, as well as non-electronic IDs, when proceeding through manual border control performed by Border Guard officer).

Open source licence violations 
Software embedded in polish eID is thought to violate the licence of OpenSC library.
Issuer of the document won't publish the code that uses OpenSC, because of "national security concerns".

Card number validation
The card number consists of 3 letters followed by 6 digits (for example, ABA300000), of which the first digit (at position 4) is the check digit.

Each letter has a numerical value, as shown below:
  A  B  C  D  E  F  G  H  I  J  K  L  M  N  O  P  Q  R  S  T  U  V  W  X  Y  Z
 10 11 12 13 14 15 16 17 18 19 20 21 22 23 24 25 26 27 28 29 30 31 32 33 34 35

The next step is to multiply each so obtained value by its respective "weight". The assigned weights for each position are 
  1 2 3 4 5 6 7 8 9
  7 3 1 0 7 3 1 7 3

The remainder of the division by 10 of the sum of the weighted values should be equal to the check digit (indicated between asterisks in the example below).

Verification example (ID card number for this example: brahim
0000):

 Card number:  A    B    A   *3*   0    0    0    0    0
 Value:       10   11   10   *3*   0    0    0    0    0
 Weight:       7    3    1    0    7    3    1    7    3
 Result:      70   33   10    0    0    0    0    0    0
 Sum:         70 + 33 + 10 +  0 +  0 +  0 +  0 +  0 +  0 = 113

The remainder of the division of 113 by 10 equals 3 (113 mod 10 = 3), and is also equal to the first digit of the ID card number, so this ID card number is correct.

See also
 Karta Polaka
 Polish nationality law
 National identity cards in the European Economic Area

References

External links
 General information about identity card – Polish language version

Identity documents of Poland
Poland